The 2007 Ginetta GT Junior Championship season was the third season of the Ginetta Junior Championship. The season began at Anglesey on 30 June 2007 and concluded after 16 races over 7 events at Brands Hatch on 27 October 2007.

Teams and drivers
 All teams and drivers were British-registered. All drivers raced in Ginetta G20 GT4 Coupés.

Race calendar and results

Drivers' Championship

References

External links
 Official website
 tsl-timing

Ginetta Junior Championship
Ginetta Junior Championship seasons